is a Japanese professional footballer who plays as a centre-back and defensive midfielder for Bundesliga club Eintracht Frankfurt. He played for the Japan national team, for which he served as captain.

Club career

Urawa Red Diamonds
After graduating from Fujieda Higashi High School in 2002, he joined Urawa Reds. He became a regular of their first team in the 2003 season. He played mainly as defensive midfielder with Keita Suzuki. In 2004, he was honoured with the J.League Cup New Hero Award and selected as a member of J.League team of the year. He was also the Urawa Fans' Player of the Year that season. The Reds won the championship in the 2006 J1 League for the first time in the club history and the first Asian title of the 2007 AFC Champions League.

It was reported in October 2007 that Italian Serie A side A.C. Siena was keen to sign Hasebe the following January.

VfL Wolfsburg

However, he signed for Bundesliga side Wolfsburg becoming the first Japanese player ever to play for the Wolves. In 2009, he became the second Japanese player to win the Bundesliga title.

On 29 April 2010, it was announced that Hasebe extended his contract with Wolfsburg until 2012.

On 17 September 2011, Hasebe played in goal for the final nine minutes of an away match against 1899 Hoffenheim. Wolfsburg lost the match 3–1, with Hasebe conceding Hoffenheim's third goal on 85 minutes. On 3 December 2011, he played his 100th Bundesliga match against 1. FSV Mainz 05.

1. FC Nürnberg
On 2 September 2013, Hasebe signed a three-year contract with 1. FC Nürnberg.

Eintracht Frankfurt
Hasebe moved to Bundesliga team Eintracht Frankfurt for the 2014––15 season, where he was an instant starter, missing just one competitive match in his first season. In the 2015–16 season, he was also a midfielder for Frankfurt, who only managed to stay in the relegation play-off against Hasebe's former club Nuremberg. Under Frankfurt's new coach Niko Kovač, the Japanese player was called up for the first time at centre-back at the end of October 2016 as a central link in a five-man backline and played in this position from then on. He played in the final of the DFB-Pokal that season, which was lost 2–1 to Borussia Dortmund, although Hasebe's season had already ended in March 2017 due to knee surgery.

In the 2017–18 season, he finished eighth in the Bundesliga with Eintracht and also played in the DFB-Pokal final with them again. There, in May 2018, the team won its first title in 30 years after a 3–1 victory over FC Bayern Munich and qualified for the group stage of the Europa League as a result. In the latter competition, he played full time in all 14 of his team's matches the following season and, after victories over Shakhtar Donetsk, Inter Milan and Benfica Lisbon, they advanced to the semi-finals against Chelsea FC, to whom they were defeated on penalties.

Due to his strong performances during the season, he was rated "International Class" by kicker sports magazine in both the winter of 2018–19 and summer of 2019, and was included in the end-of-season team by the Association of Contract Footballers. With his 309th appearance on 6 June 2020 against 1. FSV Mainz 05, Hasebe became the record Asian player in the Bundesliga.

At the start of the 2020–21 season, the Japanese player was the oldest player in the Bundesliga at the age of 36. Following the end of David Abraham's professional career in January 2021, a permanent new team captain was not appointed, but Hasebe has led Eintracht onto the field as captain for most of the time since. On 18 February 2022, Hasebe signed a contract extension till 2027. His original contract was due to expire this summer. He will spend one more year as a player before taking on a coaching role in the summer of 2023. On 18 May 2022, Hasebe won UEFA Europa League title, coming on as a substitute in the final against Rangers F.C.

International career

Hasebe made his debut for the Japan senior national team under manager Zico on 11 February 2006, in a friendly match against the USA at AT&T Park in San Francisco. Although he played three matches under Zico, he was not selected for the 2006 World Cup.

After 2006 World Cup, Hasebe was soon capped for Japan under new manager Ivica Osim. Although he played three matches under Osim in 2006, he could not play at all in 2007. Osim suffered a stroke in November 2007 and Takeshi Okada replaced him as manager in December. In May 2008, Hasebe played for Japan against Ivory Coast for the first time in one and a half a year. From that point onwards, he regularly featured in the squad as a defensive midfielder alongside Yasuhito Endō.

Hasebe was the onfield captain in the 2010 FIFA World Cup, as Yoshikatsu Kawaguchi was the third-choice goalkeeper, and was captain in the 2011 AFC Asian Cup. He captained the team for three World Cup campaigns, until he announced his international retirement after Japan lost 3–2 against Belgium in the Round of 16 of 2018 FIFA World Cup. At the 2010 World Cup, Hasebe played all four matches and Japan qualified to the knockout stage.

After the 2010 World Cup, Hasebe also served as a captain under new manager Alberto Zaccheroni. In 2011, Japan won the champions in 2011 Asian Cup. He played all six matches and scored a goal against Syria. From late 2013, Hasebe played as defensive midfielder with Hotaru Yamaguchi instead of Endo. In 2014, he played three matches in the 2014 World Cup. However, Japan was eliminated in the group stage.

Hasebe played the entirety of all four matches in the 2015 Asian Cup, where Japan was eliminated in the quarter-finals. His appearances were limited in 2017 due to injuries. In 2018, he was in the 2018 World Cup squad. He played all four matches as a defensive midfielder alongside Gaku Shibasaki and Japan qualified to the knockout stage. Following the World Cup, he retired from the Japan national team, having played a total of 114 games and scored two goals.

Career statistics

Club

International

Scores and results list Japan's goal tally first, score column indicates score after each Hasebe goal.

Honours
Urawa Red Diamonds
 AFC Champions League: 2007
 J1 League: 2006
 J1 League 2nd Stage: 2004
 Emperor's Cup: 2005, 2006
 J.League Cup: 2003
 Japanese Super Cup: 2006

VfL Wolfsburg
 Bundesliga: 2008–09

Eintracht Frankfurt
 DFB-Pokal: 2017–18
 UEFA Europa League: 2021–22

Japan
 AFC Asian Cup: 2011
 Kirin Cup: 2008, 2009, 2011

Individual
 J.League Best XI: 2004
 J.League Cup New Hero Award: 2004
 AFC Asian International Player of the Year: 2018
 UEFA Europa League Squad of the Season: 2018–19
 VDV Team of the Season: 2018–19
 kicker Bundesliga Team of the Season: 2018–19

See also
 List of footballers with 100 or more caps

References

External links

 
 
 

1984 births
Living people
People from Fujieda, Shizuoka
Association football people from Shizuoka Prefecture
Japanese footballers
Association football midfielders
Japan international footballers
AFC Asian Cup-winning players
2010 FIFA World Cup players
2011 AFC Asian Cup players
2013 FIFA Confederations Cup players
2014 FIFA World Cup players
2015 AFC Asian Cup players
2018 FIFA World Cup players
FIFA Century Club
J1 League players
Bundesliga players
Urawa Red Diamonds players
VfL Wolfsburg players
1. FC Nürnberg players
Eintracht Frankfurt players
UEFA Europa League winning players
Japanese expatriate footballers
Japanese expatriate sportspeople in Germany
Expatriate footballers in Germany